Michael McCarthy (born February 22, 1965, Cincinnati, Ohio, United States) is an American record producer, who has been recording music since 1984.

McCarthy has worked as a producer on five Spoon albums, from Girls Can Tell until Ga Ga Ga Ga Ga, as well as Patty Griffin's Children Running Through, Sound Team's Movie Monster, and albums by …And You Will Know Us by the Trail of Dead, The Features and The Sun (Don't Let Your Baby Have All the Fun).

McCarthy lives in Nashville, Tennessee.

Discography
Spoon

Ga Ga Ga Ga Ga (produced / recorded / mixed), Merge
Gimme Fiction (produced / recorded / mixed), Merge/Matador
Kill the Moonlight (produced / recorded / mixed), Merge
Girls Can Tell (produced / recorded / mixed), Merge

Heartless Bastards
The Mountain (produced / recorded / mixed), Fat Possum Records

Dead Confederate
Wrecking Ball (produced / recorded / mixed), TAO/Razor and Tie Records

Wild Sweet Orange
We Have Cause to Be Uneasy (produced / recorded / mixed), Canvasback Records

...And You Will Know Us by the Trail of Dead
So Divided (produced / recorded / mixed), Interscope
Worlds Apart (produced / recorded / mixed), Interscope
The Secret of Elena's Tomb (produced / recorded / mixed), Interscope
Source Tags & Codes (produced / recorded / mixed)
Relative Ways EP (produced / recorded / mixed), Interscope
Madonna (produced / recorded / mixed), Merge

Patty Griffin
Children Running Through (produced / recorded / mixed) ATO records

Lee Ann Womack
Something Worth Leaving Behind (produced / recorded / mixed), MCA
I Hope You Dance (recorded / mixed), MCA
The Lonely, The Lonesome & The Gone (produced / engineer / mixer), ATO

The Features
Exhibit A (produced / recorded), Universal

AM Taxi
We Don't Stand a Chance (produced / recorded / mixed), Virgin

Fastball

Keep Your Wig On (produced Recorded), Ryko

Forget Cassettes
Instruments of Action (produced / recorded / mixed), Theory 8

Goudie
Peep Show (produced / recorded / mixed), TMC/Elektra

Sound Team
Movie Monster (produced / recorded / mixed), Capitol

Jack Ingram
Electric (produced / recorded / mixed), Sony

Sixteen Deluxe
The Moonman is Blue (produced / recorded / mixed), Sugar Fix

Carson McHone
Carousel (produced / recorded / mixed), Nine Mile Records / Loose

References

External links

1965 births
Living people
Record producers from Ohio
Businesspeople from Cincinnati